Protojaniridae is a family of crustaceans belonging to the order Isopoda.

Genera:
 Anneckella Chappius & Delamare-Deboutteville, 1957
 Cuyojanira Grosso, 1992
 Enckella Fresi, Idato & Scipione, 1980
 Namibianira Kensley, 1995
 Protojanira Barnard, 1927
 Protojaniroides Fresi, Idato & Scipione, 1980

References

Isopoda